Davide Baiardo (11 May 1887 – 28 November 1977) was an Italian swimmer. He competed at the 1908 Summer Olympics and the 1912 Summer Olympics.

References

1887 births
1977 deaths
Italian male swimmers
Olympic swimmers of Italy
Swimmers at the 1908 Summer Olympics
Swimmers at the 1912 Summer Olympics
Sportspeople from Genoa